The 2001 Sherbrooke municipal election was held on November 4, 2001, to elect a mayor and city councillors in Sherbrooke, Quebec. The communities of Brompton and Lennoxville also elected borough councillors, who do not serve on the city council.

Results

Mayor

Councillors

Marie-Paule Samson served on council for four years before her defeat in 2001. She worked with the Societe de Developpement Economique de la Region Sherbrookoise, the regional police. and the CLD.

Source: "Election 2001 Sherbrooke & Townships," Sherbrooke Record, 6 November 2001, p. 4.

References

2001 Quebec municipal elections
2001
November 2001 events in Canada